Chester Football Club is an association football club based in Chester.

The club was founded in 2010 following the liquidation of Chester City. In its inaugural season it competed in Division One North of the Northern Premier League, following a successful appeal to the Football Association against its initial placement in the North West Counties League. After winning this division, it then won the Northern League Premier Division in 2011–12 and the Conference North in 2012–13. Chester returned to the National League North following relegation in 2017–18.

Seasons

Notes

References

External links

Official website
Unofficial website and history database

Chester